Robert Theodore Trumpy Jr. (born March 6, 1945) is an American former professional football player who was a tight end for the Cincinnati Bengals in the American Football League (AFL) and National Football League (NFL) from 1968 through 1977. He was a two-time NFL Pro Bowler and a two-time AFL All-Star. Following his playing career he spent many years as a broadcast color analyst, calling four Super Bowls. He was given the Pete Rozelle Radio-Television Award by the Pro Football Hall of Fame in 2014.

Playing career
Trumpy attended Springfield High School in Springfield, Illinois, playing football, basketball, and track-and-field.  He played in four different state tournaments that took place at the University of Illinois during this time, two in basketball and two in track, where he won the 1963 state meet in long jump and tied for fifth in high jump.  After graduation in 1963, Trumpy played college football at Illinois.  Since freshmen were not allowed to play on the varsity team, his first season was in 1964 as a wide receiver, where he caught 28 passes for 428 yards and 2 touchdowns before missing the last two games of the season with a knee injury.  He then transferred to the University of Utah, which required him to miss the 1965 season.  In 1966, he converted to tight end, catching 9 passes for 159 yards and 2 scores.  After graduation, Trumpy was drafted by the U.S. Navy and spent 180 days in it during the Vietnam War.

After being discharged from the Navy, Trumpy worked briefly as a bill collector before being selected by the AFL's Bengals in the 12th round (301st overall) of the 1968 Common Draft. Despite his low draft selection, Trumpy worked hard in the offseason and managed to earn the starting tight end spot in the team's lineup. He didn't disappoint in his rookie season, recording 37 receptions for 639 yards and three touchdowns, and earning a place on the AFL Western Division All-Star team.

In 1969, Trumpy was selected by The Sporting News as the AFL's All-League tight end.

The following year, 1970, with the Bengals now part of the National Football League following the AFL-NFL merger, Trumpy had the best season of his career, catching 37 passes for 835 yards (a franchise record 22.6 yards per catch average) and nine touchdowns. In a game against the Houston Oilers, Trumpy became the first Bengals tight end to record three touchdown receptions in a single game, helping his team to a 31–31 tie.

1977
Trumpy continued to play for the Bengals until 1977, earning two trips to the Pro Bowl in 1970 and 1973. In his final season, he caught only 18 passes for 251 yards and one touchdown, but his touchdown was one of the most memorable plays of his career. In a November 20 game against the Miami Dolphins during a driving rainstorm, Trumpy caught a 29-yard touchdown pass from quarterback Ken Anderson on a flea flicker play that involved three players handling the ball before it was thrown to him. First, Anderson handed the ball off to running back Archie Griffin, who then pitched the ball to receiver John McDaniel running in the opposite direction. McDaniel then handed the ball back to Anderson, setting up his 29-yard touchdown pass to Trumpy. The Bengals went on to defeat the Dolphins 23–17, knocking them out of playoff contention. "It was magic", said Trumpy about the play,

Career statistics
Trumpy finished his 10-year career with 298 receptions for 4,600 yards and 35 touchdowns in 128 games. His 4,600 receiving yards, 35 touchdown receptions, and 15.4 yards per catch average are the most ever by a Bengals tight end.

Broadcasting career
After his playing career, Trumpy turned to NFL broadcasting. In 1978, he joined NBC as a color analyst for telecasts of AFC games, working primarily with Sam Nover through 1980, then with Bob Costas (1981–1983) and Don Criqui (1984–1988). Trumpy and Criqui also served as NBC Radio's lead NFL announcers in from 1985 to 1986, calling Monday Night Football and Super Bowls XX and XXI.

In 1992, Trumpy replaced Bill Walsh as NBC's lead NFL analyst, teaming with Dick Enberg until 1995 (when NBC went to a three-man booth with Paul Maguire and Phil Simms replacing him). The team of Enberg and Trumpy called Super Bowls XXVII (1993) and XXVIII (1994). He would then be paired with Tom Hammond (1995–1996) and Charlie Jones (1997) until NBC lost the AFC package to CBS following the 1997 season.

Trumpy hosted a weeknight sports talk show on WLW-AM in Cincinnati, Ohio (1980–1989). He left the show to be able to work more assignments at NBC Sports, including PGA Tour golf and the Olympics. He was replaced on the sports talk show by Cris Collinsworth.

On the night of November 10, 1983, while he was hosting his talk show on WLW, the first call that he received was from a despondent woman who said that she wanted to commit suicide.  Trumpy spoke to the woman (and, later, her son) for more than two hours until the son gave him their address.  He then spoke to the woman and her son for several more minutes after that until his station manager took him off the air.  Police in Forest Park, Ohio went to the address that the son had given and took the woman to a local hospital.  Trumpy received praise for his actions from the Forest Park police and suicide prevention counselors.  He later said that he had to go to therapy because of the incident.

Trumpy was an analyst for Sunday Night Football on Westwood One radio from 2000 to 2007 (save for the 2005 season, when he was replaced by John Riggins), and also called playoff games for the network. He was most frequently paired with Joel Meyers on the Sunday night games.

During the first round of the 2006-07 NFL playoffs, Trumpy and Enberg were in the broadcast booth together for the first time since the 1994 AFC Championship Game, covering the Colts-Chiefs game for Westwood One. They were paired again for the Patriots-Chargers game the following weekend.

Trumpy was named the 2014 recipient of the Pete Rozelle Radio-Television Award, given by the Pro Football Hall of Fame for lifetime achievement in NFL broadcasting.

Personal life
Trumpy is married to his wife Pat, and together they have two sons  (Matthew and Jason) and six grandchildren. The couple lives in the Cincinnati suburb of Glendale, Ohio.  He is a member of the Sigma Chi fraternity.

See also
Other American Football League Players

References

Ludwig, Chick. Cincinnati Bengals, The Legends. Willmington, OH: Orange Frazer P, 2004.  page 25.(1)

External links

1945 births
Living people
American Conference Pro Bowl players
American Football League All-Star players
American Football League All-League players
American Football League players
American football tight ends
American sports radio personalities
Cincinnati Bengals players
College football announcers
Golf writers and broadcasters
National Football League announcers
Notre Dame Fighting Irish football announcers
Olympic Games broadcasters
People from Glendale, Ohio
Pete Rozelle Radio-Television Award recipients
Players of American football from Illinois
Sportspeople from Springfield, Illinois
Utah Utes football players
Volleyball commentators
Major Indoor Soccer League (1978–1992) commentators